Henry Branch is a stream in the U.S. state of West Virginia.

The stream was named after Henry Perry, a pioneer settler.

See also
List of rivers of West Virginia

References

Rivers of Mingo County, West Virginia
Rivers of West Virginia